Moses Sakyi (born 12 March 1981) is a Ghanaian former professional footballer who played as a centre forward.

Club career
Born in Accra, Sakyi made his senior debut with Liberty Professionals FC, where he shared teams with future Chelsea player Michael Essien. He went on to compete professionally in a host of countries, representing Yozgatspor, İstanbulspor (Turkey), PFC Slavia Sofia (Bulgaria), S.C. Olhanense and C.F. Estrela da Amadora (Portugal).

From January 2008 to 2012, other than in Portugal's Segunda Liga, Sakyi played professionally in the Cypriot First Division, the Chinese Super League, the Kazakhstan Premier League and the Indonesia Super League. On 21 June 2013, he was supposed to sign with C.D. Tondela, but nothing came of it, and he met the same fate with SC Mirandela. After two years out of football he joined another Portuguese club, Moura AC.

International career
Sakyi won the first of his two caps for Ghana on 14 June 2004, in a 0–0 friendly against Togo.

References

External links

1981 births
Living people
Footballers from Accra
Ghanaian footballers
Association football forwards
Ghana Premier League players
Liberty Professionals F.C. players
FC St. Pauli players
Süper Lig players
Yimpaş Yozgatspor footballers
İstanbulspor footballers
First Professional Football League (Bulgaria) players
PFC CSKA Sofia players
PFC Slavia Sofia players
Primeira Liga players
Liga Portugal 2 players
Segunda Divisão players
G.D. Estoril Praia players
S.C. Olhanense players
C.F. Estrela da Amadora players
Gondomar S.C. players
C.D. Pinhalnovense players
Cypriot First Division players
AEL Limassol players
Chinese Super League players
Zhejiang Professional F.C. players
Kazakhstan Premier League players
FC Akzhayik players
Al Ain FC players
Liga 1 (Indonesia) players
Persib Bandung players
Ghana international footballers
Ghanaian expatriate footballers
Ghanaian expatriate sportspeople in Germany
Expatriate footballers in Germany
Ghanaian expatriate sportspeople in Turkey
Expatriate footballers in Turkey
Ghanaian expatriate sportspeople in Bulgaria
Expatriate footballers in Bulgaria
Ghanaian expatriate sportspeople in Portugal
Expatriate footballers in Portugal
Ghanaian expatriate sportspeople in Cyprus
Expatriate footballers in Cyprus
Ghanaian expatriate sportspeople in China
Expatriate footballers in China
Ghanaian expatriate sportspeople in Kazakhstan
Expatriate footballers in Kazakhstan
Ghanaian expatriate sportspeople in the United Arab Emirates
Expatriate footballers in the United Arab Emirates
Ghanaian expatriate sportspeople in Indonesia
Expatriate footballers in Indonesia